is a Japanese professional baseball player. He was born on October 21, 1985. He debuted in 2013 for the Hokkaido Nippon-Ham Fighters.

References

Living people
1985 births
People from Sagamihara
Japanese baseball players
Nippon Professional Baseball pitchers
Hokkaido Nippon-Ham Fighters players